Luca Van Assche was the defending champion, but chose not to participate. He participated in the men's singles qualifying but lost in the first round to Juan Manuel Cerúndolo.

Gabriel Debru won the title, defeating Gilles-Arnaud Bailly in the final, 7–6(7–5), 6–3.

Seeds

Draw

Finals

Top half

Section 1

Section 2

Bottom half

Section 3

Section 4

Qualifying

Seeds

Qualifiers

Draw

First qualifier

Second qualifier

Third qualifier

Fourth qualifier

Fifth qualifier

Sixth qualifier

Seventh qualifier

Eighth qualifier

References

External links 
Draw at rolandgarros.com
Draw at ITFtennis.com

Boys' Singles
French Open, 2022 Boys' Singles